Masabi (also Romanized as Maş‘abī, Ma‘şabī, and Moş‘abī; also known as Mosāvī and Musavi) is a village in Masabi Rural District, in the Central District of Sarayan County, South Khorasan Province, Iran. At the 2006 census, its population was 821, in 274 families.

References 

Populated places in Sarayan County